Dame Helen Valerie Atkinson  (born 29 April 1960) is Pro-Vice-Chancellor of Cranfield University's School of Aerospace, Transport and Manufacturing.  She was previously Head of the University of Leicester's Department of Engineering and later Leicester's Graduate Dean. In 2010, she was designated one of the UKRC's Women of Outstanding Achievement and featured in the Women of Outstanding Achievement Photographic Exhibition. She was elected a fellow of the Royal Academy of Engineering in 2007, was a vice-president of the Academy from 2012 to 2014 and was elected to its Trustee Board in 2014.

Atkinson was appointed Commander of the Order of the British Empire (CBE) in 2014 and Dame Commander of the Order of the British Empire (DBE) in the 2021 Birthday Honours for services to engineering and education.

Education 
Atkinson has a first class degree from Girton College, Cambridge in Metallurgy and Materials Science, and a PhD from Imperial College, London. Her PhD is on the transmission electron microscopy of grain growth in oxide scales, and was carried out at the Atomic Energy Authority at Harwell.

References 

1960 births
Living people
Academics of Cranfield University
Alumni of Girton College, Cambridge
Alumni of Imperial College London
Dames Commander of the Order of the British Empire
Fellows of the Royal Academy of Engineering
Female Fellows of the Royal Academy of Engineering
People educated at South Park High School, Lincoln
20th-century British engineers
21st-century British engineers
20th-century women engineers
21st-century women engineers